The 1994 E3 Harelbeke was the 37th edition of the E3 Harelbeke cycle race and was held on 26 March 1994. The race started and finished in Harelbeke. The race was won by Andrei Tchmil of the Lotto team.

General classification

References

1994 in Belgian sport
1994